Like many large cities, numerous festivals have become part of the Buffalo's culture and tradition. Though most of the festivals occur during the summer months, the city has recently pushed to have winter festivals as well, in an effort to capitalize on the region's snowy reputation.

Summer festivals

 Allentown Art Festival – largest festival of the year; held on the second weekend of June in the  Allentown neighborhood
 The BASH – military-themed fundraiser; proceeds go towards vital disaster preparedness education and response in Western New York communities
 Buffalo Brewfest
 Buffalo Gay Pride Festival
 Buffalo Greek Festival
 Buffalo Niagara Blues Festival
 Curtain Up! – marks the beginning of the Buffalo theater season
 Dożynki Polish Harvest Festival
 Elmwood Avenue Festival of the Arts
 Friendship Festival – joint festival with Fort Erie, Ontario celebrating Canada–United States relations
 Italian Festival
 Juneteenth Festival – annual celebration of the freedom of slaves
 Music is Art Festival
 National Buffalo Wing Festival
 Nickel City Con – Upstate NY's largest comic book & pop culture festival held annually in May at the Buffalo Niagara Convention Center
 Taste of Buffalo – one of the largest outdoor food festivals in the country
 Thursday at the Square – weekly outdoor summer concert series on Thursday evenings during the summer and fall

Fall festivals 

 Buffalo International Film Festival

Winter festivals
 Buffalo Ball Drop
 Buffalo Powder Keg Festival
 Dyngus Day Buffalo
 Labatt Blue Pond Hockey
 Saint Patrick's Day Parades – In addition to the parade held in the downtown area on a Sunday either before or after March 17, the "Old Neighborhood" parade is held the day before in the southern part of Buffalo, which is heavily populated by ethnic Irish residents and where the first parades were originally held.
 World's Largest Disco

References

 
Buffalo